The women's javelin throw event at the 1967 Summer Universiade was held at the National Olympic Stadium in Tokyo on 1 September 1967. There were only four participants.

Results

References

Athletics at the 1967 Summer Universiade
1967